The Museum at Eldridge Street is a museum located within the Eldridge Street Synagogue that tells the story of its congregation and contemporary Jewish culture and practice. While historically part of the Lower East Side of Manhattan, Chinatown has expanded east and the museum is considered to be part of both neighborhoods. The museum, which was designed by Walter Sedovic and Jill H. Gotthelf, opened in December 2007 following the synagogue's twenty-year renovation, during which time it was known as the Eldridge Street Project. The capstone of the renovation was the installation of Kiki Smith and Deborah Gans' stained glass window to replace a plain one that congregation had installed to protect the sanctuary when funds were limited. The museum later played host to an exhibit dedicated to Smith's work.

In addition to telling the history of the synagogue's congregation, restoration, and the neighborhood's history, the museum also tells the story of other neighboring organizations, such as The Forward, and the broader Jewish community. The museum's "Egg Rolls, Egg Creams and Empanadas" Festival, held annually in June, celebrates the neighborhood's diversity.

References

External links

Museums established in 2007
Museums in Manhattan
Lower East Side
Judaism in New York City
Jewish museums in New York City